Erdaojiang District is a district of Tonghua, Jilin, China.

Administrative Divisions
Subdistricts:
East Tonghua Subdistrict, Taoyuan Subdistrict

Towns:
Wudaojiang, Tiechang, Yayuan

The only township is Erdaojiang Township

References

External links

County-level divisions of Jilin